Tepe-Korgon is a village in Aravan District, Osh Region of Kyrgyzstan. Its population was 9,186 in 2021.

Population

References

Populated places in Osh Region